The 1970 NCAA University Division Outdoor Track and Field Championships were contested June 16−18 at the 48th annual NCAA-sanctioned track meet to determine the individual and team national champions of men's collegiate University Division outdoor track and field events in the United States.

That year's outdoor meet was hosted by Drake University at Drake Stadium (the same location as the eponymous Drake Relays) in Des Moines, Iowa.

BYU, Kansas, and Oregon finished tied atop the team standings, with 35 points each. All three were declared co-champions; it was the Cougars' first title, the Jayhawks' third, and the Ducks' fourth.

Program changes 
 The decathlon was contested at the NCAA championships for the first time this year.

Results summary

Team standings
 Note: Top 10 only
 (H) = Hosts
 Full results

Individual event champions

References

NCAA Men's Outdoor Track and Field Championship
NCAA University Division Track and Field Championships
NCAA
NCAA University Division Track and Field Championships